Andreas Cathrinus Backer (30 May 1895 – 10 August 1975) was a Norwegian journalist, newspaper editor and organizational leader.

Backer was born in Mo, Telemark, the son of priest Hans Backer and Johanne Offenberg, and was a brother of Thomas Offenberg Backer. He was a journalist for the newspaper Aftenposten from 1917, and editor of Gjengangeren from 1924. He worked as secretary for the Norwegian Trekking Association from 1927, and was appointed secretary-general from 1945 to 1956. He edited the annals of the organization from 1929 to 1945.

References

1895 births
1975 deaths
People from Tokke
Norwegian newspaper editors